Dayman may refer to:

People
Dayman (surname)

Places
Daymán River, Uruguay
Dayman Island, a privately owned island off the coast of British Columbia, Canada
Dayman Island, Queensland, one of the Torres Strait Islands located between Australia and New Guinea
Cape Dayman, Victoria Land, Antarctica

Other
Dayman, a fictional heroic character referenced in the television show It's Always Sunny in Philadelphia and the musical The Nightman Cometh

See also
Dayman Big-eyed Tree Frog, Nyctimystes daymani
Daysman (disambiguation)